Kallikreins are a subgroup of serine proteases, enzymes capable of cleaving peptide bonds in proteins. In humans, plasma kallikrein (encoded by KLKB1 gene) has no known paralogue, while tissue kallikrein-related peptidases (KLKs) encode a family of fifteen closely related serine proteases. These genes are localised to chromosome 19q13, forming the largest contiguous cluster of proteases within the human genome. Kallikreins are responsible for the coordination of various physiological functions including blood pressure, semen liquefaction and skin desquamation.

Occurrence

In 1934, Eugen Werle reported finding a substance in the pancreas of humans and various animals in such large amounts that the pancreas could be taken for its site of origin. He named it kallikrein, by derivation from the Greek word for pancreas. Since then, similar enzymes have been found in the biological fluids of humans and other mammals, as well as in some snake venoms.

Venom
The caterpillar known as Lagoa crispata contains poison glands attached to hypodermic spines, which produce and inject venom that has been characterized as kallikrein in nature.

The venom of solenodons and some shrews like the northern short-tailed shrew consist of multiple copies of kallikrein 1 (KLK1) serine proteases.  KLK1 are very similar to serine protease found in venomous snakes like vipers, and have evolved in parallel from a common toxin precursor, which cause hypotensive effects in vivo.

Plasma kallikrein
The KLKB1 gene encoding plasma kallikrein is located on chromosome 4q34-35. It is synthesised as an inactive precursor, prekallikrein, which must undergo proteolytic processing to become activated. This is facilitated by factor XII, PRCP or other stimuli.

Plasma kallikrein liberates kinins (bradykinin and kallidin) from the kininogens, peptides responsible for the regulation of blood pressure and activation of inflammation. It is also capable of generating plasmin from plasminogen:

Structure 

Kallikrein is homologous to factor XI and consists of four apple domains and one serine protease domain.

Tissue kallikreins

Distinct from plasma kallikrein, tissue kallikreins (KLKs) are expressed throughout the human body and perform various physiological roles. As some kallikreins are able to catalyse the activation of other kallikreins, several cascades involving these proteases have been implicated in the regulation of homeostatic functions.

Function 

Similar to KLKB1, three tissue kallikreins KLK1, KLK2 and KLK12 also participate in regulation of blood pressure via the activation of bradykinin. KLK2, KLK3, KLK4, KLK5 and KLK14 are expressed in the prostate and are thought to be responsible for regulating semen liquefaction through hydrolysis of semenogelin. Desquamation of the skin is likely controlled by KLK5, KLK7 and KLK14, which are expressed in the outermost layer of the epidermis and cleave cellular adhesion proteins. Additionally, KLK6 and KLK8 are associated with neuronal plasticity in the central nervous system.

Genes
There are 15 known human tissue kallikreins: KLK1, KLK2, KLK3, KLK4, KLK5, KLK6, KLK7, KLK8, KLK9, KLK10, KLK11, KLK12, KLK13, KLK14, KLK15

Clinical significance
Kallikrein-related peptidases are targets of active investigation by drug researchers as possible biomarkers for cancer.

Prostate-specific antigen (PSA; hk3, human kallikrein gene 3) and human glandular kallikrein (hK2) are used as tumor markers for prostate cancer.

Ecallantide, lanadelumab, and berotralstat are FDA-approved drugs that inhibit kallikrein and can be used for managing Hereditary Angioedema.

See also 
 Prekallikrein
 Kinin-kallikrein system
 Kinin
 Aprotinin
 List of cutaneous conditions

References

External links 
 The MEROPS online database for peptidases and their inhibitors: S01.212
 

EC 3.4.21
Kinin–kallikrein system
Urticaria and angioedema